G-protein-coupled receptor kinase 2 (GRK2) is an enzyme that in humans is encoded by the ADRBK1 gene. GRK2 was initially called Beta-adrenergic receptor kinase (βARK or βARK1), and is a member of the G protein-coupled receptor kinase subfamily of the Ser/Thr protein kinases that is most highly similar to GRK3(βARK2).

Functions 

G protein-coupled receptor kinases phosphorylate activated G protein-coupled receptors, which promotes the binding of an arrestin protein to the receptor. Arrestin binding to phosphorylated, active receptor prevents receptor stimulation of heterotrimeric G protein transducer proteins, blocking their cellular signaling and resulting in receptor desensitization. Arrestin binding also directs receptors to specific cellular internalization pathways, removing the receptors from the cell surface and also preventing additional activation. Arrestin binding to phosphorylated, active receptor also enables receptor signaling through arrestin partner proteins. Thus the GRK/arrestin system serves as a complex signaling switch for G protein-coupled receptors.

GRK2 and the closely related GRK3 phosphorylate receptors at sites that encourage arrestin-mediated receptor desensitization, internalization and trafficking rather than arrestin-mediated signaling (in contrast to GRK5 and GRK6, which have the opposite effect). This difference is one basis for pharmacological biased agonism (also called functional selectivity), where a drug binding to a receptor may bias that receptor’s signaling toward a particular subset of the actions stimulated by that receptor.

GRK2 is expressed broadly in tissues, but generally at higher levels than the related GRK3. GRK2 was originally identified as a protein kinase that phosphorylated the β2-adrenergic receptor, and has been most extensively studied as a regulator of adrenergic receptors (and other GPCRs) in the heart, where it has been proposed as a drug target to treat heart failure. Strategies to inhibit GRK2 include using small molecules (including Paroxetine and Compound-101) and using gene therapy approaches utilizing regulatory domains of GRK2 (particularly overexpressing the carboxy terminal pleckstrin-homology (PH) domain that binds the G protein βγ-subunit complex and inhibits GRK2 activation (often called the “βARKct”), or just a peptide from this PH domain).

GRK2 and the related GRK3 can interact with heterotrimeric G protein subunits resulting from GPCR activation, both to be activated and to regulate G protein signaling pathways. GRK2 and GRK3 share a carboxyl terminal pleckstrin homology (PH) domain that binds to G protein βγ subunits, and GPCR activation of heterotrimeric G proteins releases this free βγ complex that binds to GRK2/3 to recruit these kinases to the cell membrane precisely at the location of the activated receptor, augmenting GRK activity to regulate the activated receptor. The amino terminal RGS-homology (RH) domain of GRK2 and GRK3 binds to heterotrimeric G protein subunits of the Gq family to reduce Gq signaling by sequestering active G proteins away from their effector proteins such as phospholipase C-beta; but the GRK2 and GRK3 RH domains are unable to function as GTPase-activating proteins (as do traditional RGS proteins) to turn off G protein signaling.

Interactions 

GRK2 has been shown to interact with numerous protein partners, including:

 G protein βγ complex
 G protein GNAQ family members
 GIT1 and GIT2
 PDE6G
 PRKCB1
 Src

See also 
 G protein-coupled receptor kinases
 G protein
 desensitization (medicine)
 arrestin
 Kinase

References

External links

Proteins
EC 2.7.11
Transferases
Protein kinases